Self-Portrait in a Hat is an 1893 oil on canvas self portrait by Paul Gauguin, produced following a trip to Tahiti. He shows himself in his Paris studio with Spirit of the Dead Watching in the background. It is now in the Musée d’Orsay in Paris.

References

1893 paintings
Gauguin
Paintings in the collection of the Musée d'Orsay
Portraits of men
19th-century portraits
Paintings by Paul Gauguin